Kagaru is a rural locality split between Scenic Rim Region and City of Logan , Queensland, Australia.

Geography
Kagaru's eastern border is marked by the Sydney–Brisbane rail corridor, the Logan River and Teviot Brook.  There is very little development in the area.

History
In the 1930s, a railway station in the area was named Kagaru, a Ugarapul word for the blue-winged kookaburra. In 1996, the locality was formally bounded and took the name of the railway station.

Formerly in the Shire of Beaudesert, Kagaru became split between Logan City and Scenic Rim Region following the local government amalgamations in March 2008.

The locality contains 6 households, in which 45.0% of the population are males and 55.0% of the population are females with a median age of 57, 19 years above the national average. The average weekly household income is $1,375, $63 below the national average.

References

Suburbs of Logan City
Scenic Rim Region
1997 establishments in Australia
Populated places established in 1997
Localities in Queensland